The Luttra Woman is a skeletonised bog body from the Early Neolithic period (radiocarbon-dated ), which was discovered near Luttra, Sweden, on 20 May 1943. Because her stomach contents showed that raspberries had been her last meal and she was estimated to have been a teenager or young adult at the time of her death, she was nicknamed Hallonflickan. , she was the earliest-known Neolithic person from Western Sweden.

No trace of injuries or fatal diseases was found on her body. She appears to have been tied up before her death and deliberately drowned. , an archaeologist who assisted at the initial investigation of the body, suggested that she had been either a human sacrifice or executed.

Discovery 

Wilhelmsson reported to the police, who dismissed any possibility of a prosecutable crime; since the body had been found at such a depth in a bog, it had to be very old. They informed the local representative of the Swedish National Heritage Board, senior teacher . Svensson inspected the find the next day and forwarded a discovery report to the Board, requesting an expert's assistance. The Board dispatched geologist and archaeologist  and pollen analysis expert Carl Larsson, both of whom were from the Geological Survey of Sweden. Upon arrival, they found that a protruding segment of the skeleton had been cut through during the excavation; nevertheless the well-preserved skull remained in its original position. Sahlström decided that a thorough in situ investigation was not feasible, so he had the entire block of peat in which the skeleton was partially embedded cut out and sent in a wooden box to the Swedish History Museum in Stockholm by train.

Studies 

The body lay in a north-northwestsoutheast orientation, with the head facing north. Only parts of the skeleton had been preserved; the soft tissues had completely rotted away and some bones of the skeleton, especially those between the skull and the pelvis, were missing. The skull was well-preserved, with only the inner nasal region partially gone; the conditions of the rest of the bones were not as good. Dahr, an anthropologist and osteologist, assessed the skeleton as that of a young female. Gejvall estimated the body as a woman of 20–25 years but later Karl-Göran Sjögren disagreed, suggesting that the more appropriate age category would be that of 15–20 years.

Her legs were in a tight squatting position so that her calves rested against her thighs. It was possible that her legs had been tied up and the straps or ropes used to bind her had not been preserved in the bog. Sahlström noted that the skull's imprint on the peat block indicated that she had been placed with the forehead down; Dahr agreed that she had been lying on her stomach. She seemed to have been placed in shallow water at her death or immediately afterward, and remained undisturbed in the restrained position until the discovery. The skull had a hole below the left eye socket, likely due to a long-term infection of the bone tissue, but otherwise no trace of injuries or diseases was found on her remains. Axel Bagge, an archaeologist who assisted at Sahlström's investigation, suggested that she had been deliberately drowned, either as a human sacrifice or the victim of an execution. Sten and Ahlström remarked that similar sacrifice methods had been found in Early Neolithic remains in Denmark.

There was only a lump of small yellow-brown seeds where her stomach had been; the seeds turned out to be those of raspberries. She had eaten a rather large serving of raspberries just before her death, which meant that she died in late summer, July to August. Because of her last meal and her age, she was nicknamed Hallonflickan.

A pollen analysis dating showed that the corpse was a bit more than 4,000 years old. She was the earliest-known Neolithic person from Western Sweden . The strontium signature of one of her teeth was analysed and the results indicated that she was probably born and grew up in Scania, the southernmost region of Sweden, and travelled to present-day Mönarp's bogs in a later period of her life. Researchers have tried to extract DNA from the skeleton but, they have not yet been successful.

Reconstruction and exhibition 

, her body has been on a permanent exhibition titled Forntid på Falbygden at the Falbygdens Museum, Falköping, since 1994. The exhibition has been supplemented by a reconstructed bust of her, created by Stockholm-based model-maker Oscar Nilsson.

References

Notes

Citations 

1943 archaeological discoveries
1943 in Sweden
Archaeological discoveries in Sweden
Bog bodies
Neolithic Europe
History of women in Sweden
Västra Götaland County